Sendmail, Inc. is an email management business.

The company is headquartered in Emeryville, CA with offices throughout the Americas, Europe and Asia.

History

The company was founded in 1998 by Eric Allman, creator of the sendmail open source mail transfer agent.

Managing Email

In 2005, Sendmail released the Sentrion email infrastructure platform to address the need for full-content message inspection, enabling policy-based delivery of all human and machine-generated email.

Hybrid Cloud

In 2012, Sendmail partnered with Mimecast to provide hybrid-cloud email security, archiving and continuity as some predicted that 2013 would see more organizations implementing hybrid cloud computing strategies to reduce cost and complexity of their messaging infrastructure.

Machine-Generated Email

In 2012, Sendmail released Sentrion REAC (Rogue Email Application Control)  amid growing security, compliance and other concerns posed by the growth of application-generated email and migration of email to the cloud.

Acquired by Proofpoint

In 2013, Sendmail was acquired by security-as-a-service company Proofpoint, Inc.

Timeline 

1998 Released Switch,  the commercial MTA
2000 Released Sendmail Milter API
2001 Released Mailstream Manager   for email security and compliant policy management
2003 Released Mailcenter for the enterprise
2005 Shipped first Sentrion™ appliance
2006 Celebrated 25th anniversary of internet email (MTA)
2007 Shipped Sentrion MP ‘inbound & outbound’ Appliance
2008 Released Sentrion MPV and Sentrion™ MPQ
2009 Released Sentrion Cloud Services (SaaS)
2010 Opened Sentrion App Store (www.SentrionAppStore.com)
2011 Sendmail teams with Harris and BMC on trusted enterprise cloud
2011 Released Sentrion Critical Customer Communications Enterprise Application Suite
2012 Released Sentrion REAC (Rogue Email Application Control)
2013 Acquired by Proofpoint, Inc.

References 

Computer security software
Software companies established in 1998
1998 establishments in California
Companies based in Emeryville, California
Software companies based in the San Francisco Bay Area
2013 mergers and acquisitions
Defunct software companies of the United States